AlkB homolog 5, RNA demethylase is a protein that in humans is encoded by the ALKBH5 gene.

References

Further reading